Austria competed at the 2022 Winter Paralympics in Beijing, China which took place between 4–13 March 2022. In total, 16 athletes competed in four sports.

Medalists

The following Austrian competitors won medals at the games. In the discipline sections below, the medalists' names are bolded.

| width="56%" align="left" valign="top" |

| width="22%" align="left" valign="top" |

Administration

Julia Wenninger served as Chef de Mission.

Competitors
The following is the list of number of competitors participating at the Games per sport/discipline.

Alpine skiing

Austria competed in alpine skiing.

Biathlon

Carina Edlinger competed in biathlon.

Women

Cross-country skiing

Carina Edlinger competed in cross-country skiing.

Women

Snowboarding

Two snowboarders represented Austria.

Banked slalom

Snowboard cross

Qualification legend: Q - Qualify to next round; FA - Qualify to medal final; FB - Qualify to consolation final

See also
Austria at the Paralympics
Austria at the 2022 Winter Olympics

References

Nations at the 2022 Winter Paralympics
2022
Winter Paralympics